The following is a list of episodes of The Gentle Touch, an ITV crime drama broadcast between 1980 and 1984, starring Jill Gascoine. A total of five series were produced over the course of the series run. All five series have since been released on DVD.

Episode list

Series 1 (1980)

Series 2 (1980)

Series 3 (1981–1982)

Series 4 (1982–1983)

Series 5 (1984)

References

Gentle Touch episodes